Polyosma is a genus of about 60 species of trees native to south-east Asia. They occur from China south through south-east Asia to the east coast of Australia, New Guinea, the Solomon Islands and New Caledonia.

Its taxonomic placement has long been uncertain: it was traditionally placed in Grossulariaceae, but in the APG II system it was given its own family, Polyosmaceae, which was unplaced as to order within the euasterids II (campanulids) clade. More recent research found Polyosmaceae to be a sister to the Escalloniaceae, so for simplicity's sake the Angiosperm Phylogeny Website now recommends the latter family be expanded to include this genus.

Species include:
Polyosma alangiacea F.Muell. – white alder 
Polyosma brachyandrum  Domin
Polyosma brachystachys Schltr.
Polyosma cambodiana Gagnepain – dou xian mu 
Polyosma comptonii  Baker f.
Polyosma cunninghamii Benn.
Polyosma discolor Baill.
Polyosma hirsuta C.T.White – Alder
Polyosma integrifolia Blume
Polyosma kouaouana Pillon
Polyosma leratii Guillaumin
Polyosma pancheriana Baill.
Polyosma podophylla Schltr.
Polyosma reducta F.Muell.
Polyosma rhytophloia C.T.White & W.D.Francis 
Polyosma rigidiuscula F.Muell. & F.M.Bailey
Polyosma spicata Baill.
Polyosma subintegrifolia (Guillaumin) Pillon

References

Asterid genera
Escalloniaceae